The yellow-crowned euphonia (Euphonia luteicapilla) is a species of bird in the family Fringillidae. It is found in Costa Rica, Nicaragua, and Panama, and is perhaps the most common euphonia in its range. Its natural habitats are subtropical or tropical dry forest, subtropical or tropical moist lowland forest, and heavily degraded former forest. It can be found on occasion in the canopy of small forests.

The males have an entirely yellow crown and dark throat. The females have no yellow crown and are yellowish olive color on their upper surface and have an underside of dull yellow. They're mostly indistinguishable from other euphonia, but often seen in pairs or small groups with males.

References

Further reading

yellow-crowned euphonia
Birds of Nicaragua
Birds of Costa Rica
Birds of Panama
yellow-crowned euphonia
Taxonomy articles created by Polbot